Changing the Game may refer to:

 Changing the Game (album), a 1999 album by Infamous Syndicate
 Changing the Game (film), a 2012 dramatic film
 Changing the Game (2019 film), a 2019 Hulu documentary